Castlerea Prison is a closed category, medium security prison in Castlerea, County Roscommon, Ireland. It houses men over 17 years of age. As of 2009, it had a bed capacity of 351 and the daily average number of resident inmates was 306.

History

Castlerea was established as part of the system of district mental hospitals in 1939. Operating intermittently as a tuberculosis sanitorium, it continued to function as a hospital until 1994 when it was closed. It was renamed St. Patrick's Hospital during the 1960s. From 1996 it opened as a prison accepting a small intake of inmates that year. Construction work on the main cell blocks of the prison was completed in 1998.

See also

 Prisons in Ireland

Notes

 
Prisons in the Republic of Ireland